Akim Swedru Senior High School, also known as AKISSS, is a co-educational senior high school located south of Akim Swedru, the capital of the Birim South District, a district in the Eastern Region of Ghana . Established in 1946 as a Teacher training college the college was later converted into a Secondary School in October 1970 . Students and Old Students of the School are referred to as ANUANOM . .Akisss is one of the few schools in Ghana that had benefited from the Japan Overseas cooperation volunteers program [JOCV-JICA]

History 
Established in 1946 as a Teacher training college the college was later converted into a Secondary School in October 1970, the school has over the years produced some of the 'finest' brains in the country.

Programs offered 
Below are academic programs offered in the school:[1]

 Agric science
 Business
 General arts
 General science
 Home economics
 Visual arts

Headteachers 

 Mr. G. A. Frempong
 Mr. C. O. Kwakye
 Mr. Gyaba Mensah
 Rev. Abraham Osei Donkor
 Mr. Michael Danwono

http://www.campuzfilla.com/2014/03/31/akim-swedru-shs-holds-44th-src-week-celebrations/
Mrs. Ama Asamoah

Notable alumni
Mr. Kwasi Kwaning-Bosompem, Controller and Accountant General Ghana 
Emelia Brobbey, actress, television presenter and musician

See also

 Education in Ghana
 List of schools in Ghana

References

1970 establishments in Ghana
Education in the Eastern Region (Ghana)
Educational institutions established in 1970
High schools in Ghana